Sardar, also spelled as Sardaar/Sirdar ('commander', literally 'headmaster'), is a title of royalty and nobility that was originally used to denote princes, noblemen, chiefs, kings and other aristocrats. It has also been used to denote a chief or leader of a tribe or group. It is used as a Persian synonym of the title Emir of Arabic origin.

The term and its cognates originate from Persian sardār and have been historically used across Persia (Iran), the Ottoman Empire and Turkey (as "Serdar"), Afghanistan (as "Sardar" for a member of the royal Mohammadzai clan in meaning of noblemen), Mesopotamia (now Iraq), Syria], South Asia (Pakistan, India, Bangladesh and Nepal), the Caucasus, Central Asia, the Balkans and Egypt (as "Sirdar").

The term sardar was used by Sikh leaders and generals who held important positions in various Sikh Misls. The title is still commonly used by Sikhs today. Though historically signifying one's military rank or membership of a locally important family, in the contemporary period the title is used widely in India and neighbouring countries for any respected Sikh male. Sardar was also used to refer to generals of the Maratha Empire. After the decline of feudalism, sardar later indicated a Head of State, a Commander-in-chief, and an army military rank. As a military rank, a sardar typically marked the Commander-in-Chief or the highest-ranking military officer in an army, akin to the modern Field Marshal, General of the Army or Chief of Army. The more administrative title Sirdar-Bahadur denoted a Governor-General or Chief Minister of a remote province, akin to a British Viceroy.

In Himalayan mountaineering, a sirdar is a local leader of the Sherpas. Among other duties, he records the heights reached by each Sherpa, which factors into their compensation.

Princes

The Kapurthala State, have been ruled by kings of state styled Sardar. For example, the king of Kapurthala used the title of Sardar.

Examples of regional use
 In Baluchistan, the title Sardar marked the chief of his tribe.
 In the Royal Afghan Kingdom, the original Nishan-i-Sardari (Order of the Leader), founded by King Amanullah in 1923, was bestowed for exceptional service to the Crown by the Afghan monarch. Recipients enjoyed the titles of Sardar-i-Ala or Sardar-i-Ali before their names and also received grants of land. The original Order was disbanded in 1929, and was later revived by King Muhammad Zahir Shah.
 In Ottoman Turkey, Serdar was a rank in Bosnia Eyalet with Herzegovina Eyalet, later Bosnia Vilayet, encompassing entire Bosnia and Herzegovina, and parts of Montenegro and Serbia, as well as in other parts Ottoman Montenegro, Serbia, and other lands. Serdar was also used in the Principality of Montenegro and the Principality of Serbia as an honorary "title" below that of Vojvoda. For example, Janko Vukotić who was a military leader and former prime minister of Montenegro with title of Serdar. However, these were not noble titles as there was no nobility in Serbia and Montenegro and no hereditary titles apart from those borne by members of the reigning families of both countries.
 In Persia, Sardar-i-Bozorg was the title of both Hossein Khan Sardar and his brother Hasan Khan Qajar. Both were uncles of Agha Khan Qajar, the King-Emperor of Persia and the Commander-in-chief under Emperor Fat′h-Ali Shah Qajar in the Russo-Persian Wars of 1804 and 1826.
In Punjab, village chiefs, military commanders, and noble personalities were referred to as Sardars. The title is commonly used by both Muslims and Sikhs.
 The early feudal Maratha Empire prior to Peshwa administration (1674–1749) used the title Sardar to identify an imperial court minister with military and diplomatic functions. If granted land (jagir), the title Sardar also marked a feudal superior responsible for administration, defense and taxing of the granted territory (equivalent to the European title Count, from the French comte meaning the "companion" or delegate to the Emperor that administered a county). These Sardars of the early Maratha Empire were life peers; the title was not hereditary.
 If the Sardar was appointed to Commander-in-Chief of all Maratha forces, the style Senapati was used in combination (e.g., Sardar Senapati or Sarsenapati Khanderao Yesajirao Dabhade. The title Senapati is a primogeniture hereditary title, as is evidenced by the current Senapati Shrimant Sardar Padmasenraje Dabhade of Talegaon Dabhade.
 In the Maratha Empire, the more administrative role of Sirdar-Bahadur denoted a Governor General or Chief Minister of a remote province; this best equates to a Mughal Subahdar or British Viceroy in function and rank.
 The title Sirdar was used by Englishmen to describe native noblemen in British India (e.g., Sirdars of the Deccan).

Aristocrats
 In the Hazara Division of Pakistan, the word Sardar is used by the Karlal tribe, traditionally, to stress their upper-caste status.
In the small district of Sudhanoti, Kashmir, Sardar is used by the hybrid Sudhan tribe. Also, Poonch families in this region use Sardar at the beginning of their names.
 Similarly Sardar is used by Khattar tribe noble men, native to the districts of Attock and adjacent areas of Rawalpindi. 
Sardar was used for important political, tribal, military and religious officers rankings by the Sikhs during the period of Maharaja Ranjit Singh.

Head of state
 In Persian, Sardar i-Azam was occasionally used as an alternative title for the Shahanshah's Head of government, normally styled Vazir i-Azam, notably in 1904-06 for a Qajar prince, Prince Major General Abdol Majid Mirza.
 Vallabhbhai Patel, the first Deputy Prime Minister of India was referred to as Sardar Patel; he is also now known as the "Iron Man of India".
 Sadr-e-Riyasat was the title of one Constitutional Head of State of the princely state of Kashmir, Yuvaraj Shri Karan Singhji Bahadur, who was appointed as Heir Apparent in 1931. After his father had acceded to India, ending the sovereign Monarchy, Regent in 1949 to 1956. Sardar-i-Riyasat 1956 to 1965 (succeeded on the death of his father as Maharaja of Jammu and Kashmir, 1961, no longer carrying any hereditary power), next Governor of the Indian constitutive State of Jammu and Kashmir 1965 to 1967.
Mohammed Daoud Khan of Afghanistan had the title of Sardar as president.
 Saparmurat Niyazov, the authoritarian ruler of Turkmenistan in 1990–2006, carried a few glorifying titles, one of which was Serdar (“Leader”).
Sardar Sulakhan Singh Puar of Sikh Empire had the title of Sardar. Among Sikhs, Sardar is the title used by Sikh nobles, Military leaders & village chiefs.

Military title

 Sardar is a title used by the Koli caste of Maharashtra during the reign of Bahamani and Ahmednagar Sultanates conferred by the Sultans of Both sultanates to the Koli fortkeeper or Koli protecters of hilly tracts.
 The later Maratha Empire under Peshwa administration (1749–1818) used the title Sardar to denote a Field Marshal or General of the Army.
 Sirdar was the official title of the British Commander-in-Chief of the Anglo-Egyptian army.
 The title Serdar is also common amongst Ottomans in referring to a Commander-in-Chief. The Serbs adopted this usage from the Ottomans (e.g. Serdar Janko Vukotić).
 In Turkish, Serdar or Serdar-i-Ekrem was the title of the Commander-in-Chief in several military operations throughout the Ottoman Empire history.
 In Afghanistan, Sardar-i-Salar meant Field Marshal or General of the Army.
 In Iran, Sardar is used to address Islamic Revolutionary Guard Corps high-ranking officers. (see List of senior officers of the Islamic Revolutionary Guards)
During the time of Maharaja Ranjit Singh, the term Sardar became even more common as a title given to Sikh men. Although it was officially reserved to address a high-ranking official or a commanding chief such as a general or officer.

Modern usage
 The term Sardar is today used to refer to adult male followers of the religion of Sikhism, as a disproportionate number of Sikhs have honorably served in many high-ranking positions within the Indian Army. Notable examples include Generals Joginder Jaswant Singh and Harbaksh Singh.
In Himalayan mountaineering, a Sirdar is the local leader of the Sherpas and porters. Among other duties, he records the heights reached by individual Sherpas, which dictates the amounts the Sherpas will be paid.
The title Sardar was granted to various writers and poets during Rana rule in Nepal
 HMS Sirdar was a World War II Royal Navy submarine.
 HMS Sirdar is a fictional Royal Navy destroyer in the novel The Guns of Navarone
 "Siridar" is a title of planetary rulers in Frank Herbert's Dune. The Padishah Emperor's elite troops are also called the Sardaukar.
 Sardar is now used for leaders of a tribe in Pakistan, Afghanistan, and Indian administered Kashmir. Many communities and tribes in Pakistan, especially in Punjab and Kashmir, use this title, including Dogar, Jat, Gujjar, Tanoli, Mughal and Sikh.

See also
 List of Ottoman Grand Viziers
 Mankari
 Zamindar
 Jagirdar
 Feudalism in Pakistan
 Balochistan
 Baloch tribes
 Mazhabi Sikh
 Sardar (Sherpa)

References

Heads of state
Military ranks
Titles of national or ethnic leadership
Titles in Iran
Ottoman titles
Titles in Serbia
Titles in Montenegro
Titles in Afghanistan
Titles in Pakistan
Titles in India
Feudalism in Pakistan
Indian feudalism
Punjabi words and phrases
Turkish words and phrases
Persian words and phrases
Feudalism in Bangladesh
Titles in Bosnia and Herzegovina during Ottoman period